The , also known as the , is a partly-destroyed outdoor bronze monument installed along Acueducto Avenue, in the historic center of Morelia, Michoacán, Mexico. The artwork was created by José Luis Padilla Retana and was unveiled in May 1995 in honor of those who built the city. 

The monument depicted four men, a New Spain master builder and  behind two Purépecha men, one carving a stone and the other carrying a carved block on his back. By 2020, the Supreme Indigenous Council of Michoacán (CSIM) began petitioning for the removal of the monument citing that they considered it a racist monument that portrayed slave-owning submission of indigenous people. However, they failed to reach a consensus with the city government; in February 2022, multiple CSIM members toppled two of the statues.

Description and meaning
From near to far, the first statue features a Purépecha mason who carries a stone on his back. He is dressed in torn clothes and bare-chested. The next statue shows a Purépecha man carving a squared stone. Then, shoulder to shoulder, there were the statues of a master builder holding a blueprint and  who had his left arm outstretched. According to the plaque, the mason was selected to represent the anonymous builders, the stonemason for his knowledge of cutting stone, the master builder represented the architects and engineers, and Fray Antonio symbolized the ecclesiastical and civil governments, as well as all those who influenced the erection of the city. Fray Antonio, bishop of the diocese of Michoacán, was chosen as he ordered the construction of the  during a time of drought in 1785. He was in favor of the liberties of the native peoples and of civil equality between the population.

The main message of the plaque reads in Spanish in all caps (translated to English):

José Luis Padilla Retana was the designer. He explained that the mason carries the stone on his back, not as a punishment but as a way of transporting the blocks and then carrying them up to a higher place. He also commented that Fray Antonio did not point to give an order but he pointed to the distance to a neutral point of the aqueduct. The monument is located at the starting point of the aqueduct on a vegetal slope that symbolizes the Loma de Guayangareo, where the city was built. The city was later renamed to Valladolid and later to Morelia.

History

The creation of the monument started in 1993 and was supervised by a board of trustees chaired by José Antonio Romo, a local photographic chronicler. It was installed as a means of appreciation to those who built in the 1700s the historic center of Morelia, in the state of Michoacán. It was installed on 18 May 1995, and the government of the state unveiled it three days later. The monument was never registered as municipal, state or national heritage.

By 2020, members of the Supreme Indigenous Council of Michoacán (CSIM), which is integrated by 60 indigenous communities in the state, requested to the local government the removal of the monument, citing their disagreement with it, and labeled it as racist, a symbol of slavery and submission, and a reminder of the Spanish conquest of the Purépecha State, which they termed as a genocide. The CSIM also argued that the monument recalled centuries of exploitation and trivialized how the architects and priests treated the Indigenous populations. According to the historian Eduardo Rubio Elosúa, there is no evidence of slavery involved in the construction of the aqueduct.

On 12 October 2020 (Columbus Day or Día de la Raza, as it is locally known), a demonstration took place next to the monument and damaged it minimally. The city's cultural heritage body said about the requested removal: "You just have to read the simple and clear plaque on the monument to feel pride in our city, the birthplace of great thinkers". On 1 August 2021, members of the council held a referendum in the state to determine whether or not the monument had to be removed. Of the ten tables installed, 905 people voted: 810 in favor and 87 against. Of those votes, 259 came from inhabitants of Morelia: 172 in favor and 87 against. The government did not qualify it as a binding consultation because it only represented 0.03% of the city's population. On 11 October 2021, members of the council threatened to topple the monument the following day. Instead, they covered the sculptures with a blue tarpaulin.

Toppling
On 14 February 2022, members of the council toppled the sculptures of Fray Antonio and the master builder, with the former being beheaded. In this regard, the CSIM published a bulletin informing that "[g]iven the indolence, racism, discrimination and lack of attention by the Morelia City Council [...] we decided collectively in a General Assembly of Authorities, to remove on our own account the so-called sculpture 'The Builders', for being a symbol of subordination, representation of slavery and an emblem of the Spanish genocide". The damage amounted to 800,000 pesos (US$37,000) according to the State Attorney General's Office, while the city estimated it at 200,000 pesos (US$9,700). The event took place on the 492nd anniversary of the execution of Tangaxuan II, the last ruler of the Purépecha State, by Nuño de Guzmán, a Spanish conquistador. The police arrested 24 people in various locations, 21 of whom were adults who agreed to repair the damage caused; the remaining three were minors who were referred to the corresponding court. During the same night, and as a protest, demonstrators stole three vehicles and set them on fire on Mexican Federal Highway 14. By 28 February, the defendants challenged the agreement because they considered that their rights had been violated by being arrested outside the area where the events occurred, by being exposed by the media during the protest and by being physically assaulted during their arrests, and at the same time they notified that they would legally proceed against those who arrested them.

Prior to its toppling, Padilla Retana said: "In the time of Francisco Antonio de San Miguel there was a great famine, he was a source of work for multiple indigenous people who came from various places. This sculpture had no major complication, I represented what I was asked for, I imagined the scene according to the historical elements. It represents the mason, the stonemason, those who direct the work. I don't understand why they are surprised that someone is naked and another with clothes, that's how the work was in those times and even nowadays. It's not about hurting anyone or offending anyone, it's about highlighting the human sacrifice, the effort". After its partial destruction, Padilla Retana commented that the monument was not intended to "humiliate anyone, nor denigrate our roots" and offered to rebuild it but mentioned that there are no molds of the original sculptures.

Notes

References

1995 establishments in Mexico
1995 sculptures
Bronze sculptures in Mexico
Destroyed sculptures
Morelia
Purépecha
Outdoor sculptures in Mexico
Race-related controversies in sculpture
Vandalized works of art in Mexico